Zhangjiajie National Forest Park is a national forest park located in Zhangjiajie, Hunan Province, China. It is one of several national parks within the Wulingyuan Scenic Area.

History 

Zhangjiajie National Forest Park is part of a much larger  Wulingyuan Scenic Area. In 1992, Wulingyuan was officially recognized as a UNESCO World Heritage Site. It was then approved by the Ministry of Land and Resources as Zhangjiajie Sandstone Peak Forest National Geopark in 2001. In 2004, Zhangjiajie geopark was listed as a UNESCO global geopark.

The most notable geographic features of the park are the pillar-like formations that are seen throughout the park. Although resembling karst terrain, this area is not underlain by limestones and is not the product of chemical dissolution, which is characteristic of limestone karst. They are the result of many years of physical, rather than chemical, erosion. Much of the weathering that forms these pillars is the result of expanding ice in the winter and the plants that grow on them. The weather is moist year-round, and as a result, the foliage is very dense. The weathered material is carried away primarily by streams. These formations are a distinct hallmark of the Chinese landscape, and can be found in many ancient Chinese paintings.

One of the park's quartz-sandstone pillars, the   Southern Sky Column, was officially renamed "Avatar Hallelujah Mountain" in honor of the movie Avatar in January 2010. The film's director and production designers said that they drew inspiration for the floating rocks from mountains from around the world, including those in Hunan province.

Structures

The Bailong Elevator, literally "hundred dragons sky lift", was opened to the public in 2002. At , it is the world's tallest outdoor lift. It can transport visitors to the top from its foot in less than two minutes. The structure is composed of three separate glass elevators, each of which can carry up to 50 people at a time.

In August 2016, Zhangjiajie Grand Canyon opened the Zhangjiajie Grand Canyon Glass Bridge, the longest and highest pedestrian glass bridge in the world. Thirteen days after opening, the bridge was closed due to the sheer number of visitors. On 30 September 2016, the bridge reopened after adjustments to its logistics and safety measures for handling a large number of tourists.

There are three gondola lift systems within the park.  The Tianzi Mountain Cable Car, Yangjiajie cable car and Huangshizhai cable car.

There is also a monorail to take visitors up the Ten-Mile Gallery.

See also
 Global Geoparks Network
 List of national geoparks
 Tianmen Mountain, a feature within the nearby Tianmen Mountain National Park.

References

External links

Parks in Hunan
National parks of China
Global Geoparks Network members
Protected areas established in 1988
Tourist attractions in Zhangjiajie
Geoparks in China
Forest parks in China